Butterflies in the Rain is a 1926 American silent romantic comedy film directed by Edward Sloman and starring Laura La Plante, James Kirkwood and Dorothy Cumming. The film is set in England and is based on a novel by the British writer Andrew Soutar.

Synopsis
Tina Carteret, the daughter of wealthy old English family, is attracted to feminist ideas about the freedom of the modern woman and mixed with a bohemian set of friends. When she encounters the stuffy owner of the neighbouring estate John Humphries she at first ridicules him, but later finds herself falling in love. They marry but she continues to associate with her old bohemian set, leading to her being blackmailed while on holiday in Spain.

Cast
 Laura La Plante as Tina Carteret 
 James Kirkwood as John Humphries 
 Robert Ober as Emsley Charleton 
 Dorothy Cumming as Lady Pintar 
 Oscar Beregi Sr. as Lord Purdon 
 Grace Ogden as Miss Flax 
 Dorothy Stokes as Miranda 
 Edwards Davis as Stuart Carteret 
 Edward Lockhart as Aubrey Carteret 
 James H. Anderson as Dennis Carteret 
 Blackie Thompson as Mr. Sarling 
 Rose Burdick as Marie Charleton 
 Ruby Lafayette as Mrs. Humphries

References

Bibliography
 Munden, Kenneth White. The American Film Institute Catalog of Motion Pictures Produced in the United States, Part 1. University of California Press, 1997.

External links

1926 films
1926 romantic comedy films
American silent feature films
Universal Pictures films
Films directed by Edward Sloman
Films set in England
Films set in London
Films set in Spain
Films based on British novels
American romantic comedy films
1920s English-language films
1920s American films
Silent romantic comedy films
Silent American comedy films